The Exchange  is a 29-floor tower in the Business Bay in Dubai, United Arab Emirates. Construction of The Exchange  is expected to be completed in 2008.

See also 
 List of tallest buildings in Dubai

External links

Skyscraper office buildings in Dubai